Elections to Sefton Metropolitan Borough Council were held on 1 May 2008.  One third of the council was up for election and the council stayed under no overall control.

Election result

Wards

References

Sefton Council website
Sefton Council Election Results

2008 English local elections
2008
2000s in Merseyside